Aesculus chinensis, the Chinese horse chestnut (Chinese:七叶树 qi ye shu), is a tree species in the genus Aesculus found in eastern Asia.

The seed contains triterpenoid saponins and flavonoids, such as aescuflavoside and aescuflavoside A, which are glycosides of quercetin.

Images

References

External links

chinensis
Plants described in 1833
Taxa named by Alexander von Bunge